Christian Supusepa (born 2 April 1989 in Wormerveer) is a Dutch footballer who currently plays as a left back for SV Spakenburg in the Dutch Tweede Divisie.

Career
On 7 July 2010 Supusepa signed a contract until 2012 with ADO Den Haag. He made his debut on 8 August in a game against Vitesse Arnhem. Supusepa joined A PFG club CSKA Sofia in July 2014 on a one-year contract with the option for an additional one. He left the "redmen" from Sofia at the end of the season, returning to his home country to become part of the Sparta Rotterdam squad. In January 2017 Supusepa signed with SV Spakenburg.

Personal
He is of Moluccan descent.

Honours

Club
Sparta Rotterdam
 Eerste Divisie: 2015-16

References

External links
 Voetbal International profile 
 

1989 births
Living people
Dutch footballers
ADO Den Haag players
PFC CSKA Sofia players
Sparta Rotterdam players
Eredivisie players
First Professional Football League (Bulgaria) players
Expatriate footballers in Bulgaria
Dutch expatriates in Bulgaria
Footballers from Zaanstad
Dutch people of Moluccan descent
Indo people
Association football defenders
Netherlands youth international footballers